Murph Harrold was an American poker player.  He was inducted into the Poker Hall of Fame in 1984. He was regarded as one of the best deuce-to-seven lowball poker players ever.

Notes

American poker players

Poker Hall of Fame inductees
Year of birth missing

Year of death missing